Vistaprint is a Dutch global, e-commerce company that produces physical and digital marketing products for small businesses. Vistaprint was one of the first businesses to offer its customers the capabilities of desktop publishing through the internet when it was launched in 1999. Vistaprint is wholly owned by Cimpress plc, a publicly traded company based in Ireland.

Business 
The company is based in Venlo, Netherlands, and employs over 5,100 employees in its 13 offices and printing facilities.

History
Robert Keane founded a company in Paris in 1995 called Bonne Impression, a direct marketer of desktop publishing software and pre-printed laser-printer-compatible specialty papers for printing brochures, stationery, and business cards, particularly for small businesses. In 1999, the company adopted an internet-based business model and changed its name to Vistaprint.

In September 2005, the company filed its initial public offering and began trading on the Nasdaq. It opened a European office in Barcelona, Spain, in September 2006, and in 2009 relocated to Venlo, the Netherlands.

In November 2014, the company announced it would reorganize; Vistaprint continued operating under the Vistaprint brand while the parent company became Cimpress. As a result of the change, the company's ticker symbol was changed from VPRT to CMPR.

In November 2016, Cimpress announced that it would be opening a manufacturing facility in Reno, Nevada. The facility will serve as home to more than 20 brands, one of which is Vistaprint.

In August 2018, Vistaprint announced that it would continue to expand its presence in North America with a new facility in Dallas, Texas. This will be the second manufacturing facility in the U.S. Vistaprint plans to have the manufacturing fully completed by 2023.

In October 2021, Vistaprint acquired Crello and its parent company, Depositphotos, for a total price of $85 million. After the acquisition, Crello was rebranded to VistaCreate.

In January 2023, VistaPrint announced that Florian Baumgartner would succeed Robert Keane as CEO as of February 1, 2023.

Printing process
Orders are processed online and jobs are printed using a formula based on type of job, paper stock type, print run quantity, finishing (if any) and ship-by dates, among other factors. User-selectable options are minimized, printing standard types of printed materials, such as business cards or postcards. Within each category, only specific sizes, paper stocks and ink colors are supported. This results in higher numbers of similar jobs which can be ganged together. Changeover time is reduced because there's less need to change paper or inks between jobs.

Self-service design, proofing and ordering are handled at the front-end through the web, with controlled printing, cutting, packing and dispatching handled at the back-end through printing plants. Cimpress' process involves multiple software components, and the management of multiple production components, in an end-to-end production workflow from "click to ship". Vistaprint is vertically integrated with production facilities for North America in Windsor, Ontario, and for Europe in Venlo, Netherlands. The company uses presses such as the Manroland 700 as part of its printing assembly line.

Computer-integrated manufacturing techniques help minimize human intervention and labor costs. Using browser-based desktop publishing environment, customers design and proofread the job. Jobs are routed for printing without intervention. The printing is done in a single pass on automated, high-volume, large-format presses. Once printed, the products are cut down to size using a computerized robotic cutter, assembled, packaged and addressed using proprietary software-driven processes, and shipped to the customer.

In a form of mass customization using as little as 60 seconds of production labor per order versus an hour or more for traditional printers, orders are printed faster and at lower costs than traditional printers. Their strategy is to target small-run orders usually excluded from conventional large printers.

Patents
One of the company's early hires was an in-house patent attorney. It currently holds over 100 patents worldwide. The company has described its objective as a "minefield of patents" and has been active in pursuing companies that it considers to be infringing on those patents.

In 2006, the company filed a patent infringement suit against Print24 GmbH and UnitedPrint.com AG. A German court ruled in favor of Vistaprint in July 2007. However, after appealing, the German Federal Patent Court ruled in favour of Unitedprint.com, rescinding Vistaprint’s controversial software patent in March 2009.

Separately, in May 2007, the company filed a patent infringement suit against two Taylor Corporation subsidiaries, 123Print and DrawingBoard.

Partnerships
In 2007, a strategic partnership was announced with OfficeMax to provide an in-store station in up to 900 OfficeMax stores in the US and Mexico. OfficeMax ImPress is an OfficeMax-branded web site for small business printing based on Vistaprint technologies. In 2008, Vistaprint announced a strategic partnership with Intuit, a supplier of accounting software, tying their service into Intuit's QuickBooks software using an Intuit-branded web site. In 2009, the company also announced it will supply services for the FedEx Office brand. The company announced in 2012 that it had entered into a strategic partnership with Staples Inc.

Controversies

Rewards program
In the US, Vistaprint was accused of enrolling customers into Vertrue's paid-membership reward plan without the customer's agreement. Credit card details were passed on to Vertrue (formerly Memberworks Incorporated) by Vistaprint, and charges were then made on those credit cards by Vertrue allegedly without the owner's consent. Numerous complaints were received by ConsumerAffairs.com and The Better Business Bureau by consumers objecting to these charges including the complaints of still being charged after canceling and that more than a year after cancelling membership, the charges began again.

Vistaprint's partnerships in the United Kingdom have attracted criticism. Critics have stated that Vistaprint's customers are enrolled without their knowledge in a reward voucher operated by an associated company, VPrewards.com, at a cost of GB£9.95 a month, and that no information is provided to customers subsequently. Additionally, it is up to the customers to detect the fact that they have been enrolled as members and to cancel unwanted membership.

In August 2008, four class-action lawsuits were filed against Vistaprint. The four complaints alleged that the defendants were in violation of the Electronic Funds Transfer Act (which protects from unauthorized charges) and the federal Electronic Communications and Privacy Act (which prohibits the unlawful access of financial information) for charging relatively small amounts from customers accounts "hoping that consumers just won't notice."

On November 30, 2009, the company announced that it had terminated its contract with an affiliate of Vertrue Inc., effective December 20, 2009, and that, it had ended all membership rewards or similar programs.

ASA investigations
In 2011, following complaints from UK customers, the Advertising Standards Authority (ASA) investigated pricing irregularities on Vistaprint's UK website and leaflet distributions. The ASA also upheld a complaint that Vistaprint was misleading customers in its £40 worth of printing for a £10 spend promotion.

Discriminatory mix-ups
In 2018, a recently married gay couple sued Vistaprint after they received anti-gay pamphlets, "Understanding Temptation: Fight the good fight of the faith", instead of the wedding programs they had ordered. Vistaprint CEO, Trynka Shineman, said that the wedding programs and the flyers were printed at the same time, and that the wrong shipping label was put on the boxes by a third-party partner. Vistaprint resolved the matter with the couple and the lawsuit was dropped, with an apology to the couple and donations to LGBTQ organizations.

In June 2020, two fundraisers for Black Lives Matter found that their order for Black Lives Matter posters also came with All Lives Matter posters. In an interview with Buzzfeed News the customer said "this felt like very, very clear attempts to undermine our message and undermine the message we’re trying to put out". A Vistaprint representative said that an internal investigation "found that it was an error in the automated packaging process which combined two separate customer orders." In response, the customers said that they are skeptical of the explanation, especially since the LGBTQ incident in 2018 made this seem less like a one-off.

Security Lapse 
In November 2019, security researcher Oliver Hough discovered an exposed database on the internet belonging to Vistaprint. The company quietly took the database offline after TechCrunch reached out to inform them about the discovery. Robert Crosland, a spokesperson for Vistaprint, said in a statement that the exposure affected customers in the US, the UK and Ireland.

See also
 4imprint

References

External links

Companies formerly listed on the Nasdaq
Companies of Bermuda
Printing companies of the Netherlands
Self-publishing online stores
Marketing companies established in 1995
Companies based in Limburg (Netherlands)
Buildings and structures in Venlo